Todd Labanes Moore (born December 30, 1983) is a retired American professional mixed martial artist. A professional competitor from 2005 until 2014, Moore fought in the WEC, Strikeforce, Titan FC, Legacy FC, and DREAM.

Background
Born and raised in Houston, Texas, Moore competed in wrestling for the inaugural team at Klein Forest High School and was talented. Without including Freestyle or Greco-Roman seasons, Moore compiled an overall record of 147–52. After graduating, Moore began training in mixed martial arts at the age of 18, learning Brazilian jiu-jitsu, and would earn his black belt eight and a half years later under Vinicius Magalhaes.

Mixed martial arts career

Early career
Moore compiled an undefeated amateur record of 7-0 before turning professional in 2005. Moore continued to dominate in the regional circuit, holding an undefeated record of 10-0 before being signed by the WEC.

WEC
Moore made his promotional debut at WEC 31 on December 12, 2007, against John Alessio. Moore was defeated via unanimous decision and was handed his first professional loss.

Moore made his next appearance at WEC 35 on August 3, 2008, in a Lightweight bout against Shane Roller. Moore was defeated via guillotine choke submission in the first round and was subsequently released from the promotion.

DREAM
After leaving the WEC, Moore signed with DREAM in Japan. Moore faced Japanese submission specialist Shinya Aoki at DREAM 6 on September 23, 2008, and was defeated via neck crank submission in the first round.

Strikeforce
Moore soon bounced back, however, winning three of his next four fights before being signed to a four-fight deal by Strikeforce.

Moore made his promotional debut at Strikeforce: Overeem vs. Werdum on June 18, 2011, against Mike Bronzoulis. Moore won via unanimous decision.

Moore made his next appearance against Jason High on September 23, 2011, at Strikeforce Challengers: Larkin vs. Rossborough. Moore was defeated via unanimous decision.

Independent promotions
Moore has since compiled a record of 2–1, with his most recent fight being a TKO loss to Bellator veteran Ricardo Tirloni on August 15, 2014.

Mixed martial arts record

|-
| Loss
| align=center| 16–7
| E. J. Brooks
| Decision (unanimous)
| Titan FC 30: Brilz vs. Magalhaes
| 
| align=center| 3
| align=center| 5:00
| Cedar Park, Texas United States
|Catchweight (165 lb) bout.
|-
| Loss
| align=center| 16–6
| Ricardo Tirloni
| TKO (knees)
| Arena Tour 3: Moore vs. Tirloni
| 
| align=center| 1
| align=center| N/A
| Buenos Aires, Argentina
| 
|-
| Win
| align=center| 16–5
| Edwynn Jones
| Submission (rear-naked choke)
| FF: Fury Fighting 1
| 
| align=center| 1
| align=center| 2:53
| Humble, Texas, United States
| 
|-
| Win
| align=center| 15–5
| Charles Ontiveros
| TKO (punches and elbows)
| LFC 18: Legacy Fighting Championship 18
| 
| align=center| 2
| align=center| 2:01
| Houston, Texas, United States
| 
|-
| Loss
| align=center| 14–5
| Jason High
| Decision (unanimous)
| Strikeforce Challengers: Larkin vs. Rossborough
| 
| align=center| 3
| align=center| 5:00
| Las Vegas, Nevada, United States
| 
|-
| Win
| align=center| 14–4
| Mike Bronzoulis
| Decision (unanimous)
| Strikeforce: Overeem vs. Werdum
| 
| align=center| 3
| align=center| 5:00
| Dallas, Texas, United States
| 
|-
| Win
| align=center| 13–4
| Lee King
| TKO (punches)
| WG: Worldwide Gladiator
| 
| align=center| 2
| align=center| 0:36
| Pasadena, Texas, United States
| 
|-
| Loss
| align=center| 12–4
| Brian Melancon
| TKO (punches)
| LP: Legacy Promotions
| 
| align=center| 1
| align=center| 1:00
| Houston, Texas, United States
|Return to Welterweight.
|-
| Win
| align=center| 12–3
| Derrick Krantz
| TKO (punches)
| Ascend Combat: It's On
| 
| align=center| 3
| align=center| 2:59
| Shreveport, Louisiana, United States
| 
|-
| Win
| align=center| 11–3
| Rocky Johnson
| Decision (unanimous)
| KOK 6: Fists of Fury
| 
| align=center| 3
| align=center| 5:00
| Austin, Texas, United States
| 
|-
| Loss
| align=center| 10–3
| Shinya Aoki
| Submission (neck crank)
| Dream 6: Middleweight Grand Prix 2008 Final Round
| 
| align=center| 1
| align=center| 1:10
| Saitama, Japan
| 
|-
| Loss
| align=center| 10–2
| Shane Roller
| Submission (guillotine choke)
| WEC 35
| 
| align=center| 1
| align=center| 3:00
| Las Vegas, Nevada, United States
| 
|-
| Loss
| align=center| 10–1
| John Alessio
| Decision (unanimous)
| WEC 31
| 
| align=center| 3
| align=center| 5:00
| Las Vegas, Nevada, United States
| 
|-
| Win
| align=center| 10–0
| Jay Coleman
| TKO (punches)
| ROC 14: Tournament of Champions Finals
| 
| align=center| 1
| align=center| 0:52
| Atlantic City, New Jersey, United States
| 
|-
| Win
| align=center| 9–0
| Colin O'Rourke
| TKO (elbows)
| ROC 13: Tournament of Champions Semifinals
| 
| align=center| 1
| align=center| 3:06
| Atlantic City, New Jersey, United States
| 
|-
| Win
| align=center| 8–0
| Jamie Toney
| Decision (unanimous)
| ROC 12: Tournament of Champions Quarterfinals
| 
| align=center| 3
| align=center| 5:00
| Atlantic City, New Jersey, United States
| 
|-
| Win
| align=center| 7–0
| Thomas Schulte
| TKO (punches)
| UTS 6: Ultimate Showdown 6
| 
| align=center| 3
| align=center| 0:10
| Texas, United States
| 
|-
| Win
| align=center| 6–0
| Joe Christopher
| Decision (unanimous)
| UTS 5: Ultimate Texas Showdown 5
| 
| align=center| 3
| align=center| 5:00
| Texas, United States
| 
|-
| Win
| align=center| 5–0
| TJ Waldburger
| Decision (unanimous)
| REF: Renegades Extreme Fighting
| 
| align=center| 3
| align=center| 5:00
| Houston, Texas, United States
| 
|-
| Win
| align=center| 4–0
| Jeremiah O'Neal
| Decision
| UTS 4: Ultimate Texas Showdown 4
| 
| align=center| 3
| align=center| 5:00
| Texas, United States
| 
|-
| Win
| align=center| 3–0
| Jody Draper
| TKO (punches)
| REF: Renegades Extreme Fighting
| 
| align=center| 1
| align=center| 2:04
| Houston, Texas, United States
| 
|-
| Win
| align=center| 2–0
| Frank Kirmse
| TKO (punches)
| REF: Renegades Extreme Fighting
| 
| align=center| 3
| align=center| 1:51
| Houston, Texas, United States
| 
|-
| Win
| align=center| 1–0
| Lucas Gwaltney
| TKO (doctor stoppage)
| Shooto: Battle at the Ballpark 2
| 
| align=center| 1
| align=center| 1:51
| St. Louis, Missouri, United States
|

References

External links
 

Living people
1983 births
American male mixed martial artists
Welterweight mixed martial artists
Mixed martial artists utilizing wrestling
Mixed martial artists utilizing Brazilian jiu-jitsu
Mixed martial artists from Texas
American practitioners of Brazilian jiu-jitsu
People awarded a black belt in Brazilian jiu-jitsu
Sportspeople from Harris County, Texas
People from Spring, Texas